Tyson Christopher Ward (born July 26, 1997) is an American professional basketball player for Telekom Baskets Bonn of the Basketball Bundesliga. He played college basketball for North Dakota State.

High school career
Ward attended Tampa Prep, where he was frequently overshadowed by his teammate, Juwan Durham. As a junior, Ward scored 21 points to lead Tampa Prep to a 56-41 victory over Seffner Christian in the Class 3A, District 7 final. During their senior season, Durham tore his ACL, and Ward was counted on for more scoring. Ward contributed 31 points in a 73-70 loss to Windermere Prep in the Class 3A region final. He averaged 16.4 points, 7.4 rebounds, and 4.2 assists per game. Ward was named to the first-team All-State. He was mainly recruited by Coastal Carolina and Charleston Southern, but was impressed by North Dakota State coach David Richman during a recruiting visit in March 2016 and committed to the Bison.

College career
Ward scored a freshman season-high 22 points in an overtime loss to IUPUI. He averaged 5.8 points and 3.1 rebounds per game as a freshman at North Dakota State. As a sophomore, Ward averaged 11.8 points, 5.9 rebounds, and 2.6 assists per game. Ward scored 15 points and grabbed seven rebounds in a 73-63 win over Omaha in the Summit League Tournament Championship and was named to the All-Tournament Team. He followed up this performance by scoring 23 points in a 2019 NCAA Tournament First Four win over North Carolina Central. Ward averaged 12.4 points, 6.2 rebounds, and 2.3 assists per game as a junior. Coming into his senior season, Ward gave up using social media to focus on academics and basketball. On February 29, 2019, he scored a career-high 29 points shooting 4-of-4 from three-point range in an 87-67 win over Omaha. As a senior, Ward averaged 16.9 points and 7.2 rebounds per game. He was named to the First Team All-Summit League and All-District 12 Second Team by the National Association of Basketball Coaches. Ward helped North Dakota State finish 25-8 and win the Summit League regular season and tournament championship. He finished his college career as the only player in program history with more than 1,500 points, 700 rebounds and 250 assists.

Professional career
On July 28, 2020, Ward signed with s.Oliver Würzburg of the Basketball Bundesliga.

On June 29, 2021, he has signed with Telekom Baskets Bonn of the Basketball Bundesliga (BBL).

Personal life
Ward is the son of Chris Ward, who is the head basketball coach at Hillsborough High School. His father also owns a gym.

References

External links
North Dakota State Bison bio

1997 births
Living people
American men's basketball players
Basketball players from Tampa, Florida
North Dakota State Bison men's basketball players
Shooting guards
Telekom Baskets Bonn players